Bishop Methodius (secular name Dmitry Ivanovich Petrovtsy; October 30, 1941 – September 13, 2013) was a bishop of the Ukrainian Orthodox Church (Moscow Patriarchate)

Notes
 Obituary in Russian

1941 births
2013 deaths
Ukrainian Orthodox bishops